Blind Corner (U.S. Man in the Dark) is a 1964 British thriller film directed by Lance Comfort and starring William Sylvester and Barbara Shelley.  It also features popular singer of the time Ronnie Carroll playing himself.

The film is a tale of a cold, mercenary and scheming wife finally getting her comeuppance and was publicised with the tagline: "She loved one man for kicks...one man for luxury...one man for murder".  The Time Out Film Guide describes it as "an unassuming but occasionally effective second-feature thriller."

Plot
Paul Gregory (Sylvester) is a blind but very successful pop music composer, married to the beautiful Anne (Shelley).  Anne is having a secret affair with struggling artist Rickie Seldon (Alexander Davion), and persuades Paul to commission Rickie to paint her portrait as a pretext to enable them to spend time together.  Paul agrees, but after a recording session with Ronnie Carroll he is told by his business partner Mike Williams (Mark Eden) that Anne and Rickie have been seen about town together in circumstances which leave no doubt that they are more than friends.  Paul knows that Mike has always disliked Anne and suspects he may be trouble-causing, but is finally persuaded of the validity of his allegations.

Paul makes it clear to Anne that he has found out about the affair and threatens to leave her.  Fearing her meal-ticket is about to disappear, she tells Rickie that they will have to arrange an "accident" to Paul by getting him drunk and pushing him off the balcony of their home.  If Rickie does not agree, she suggests, their affair must end.  The plan is attempted, but is botched by Rickie, whose heart is not really in it.  After a struggle, he and Paul start to talk and Paul tells him to open his eyes to Anne's true nature, suggesting that she may well be double-crossing him too.  Rickie, having no personal antipathy towards Paul, comes to the conclusion that he may be right.  The pair end up forming an unlikely alliance, unknown to Anne, to try to entrap her into revealing her true motives.  Between them they manage to set her up, and discover that the serious romance is between Anne and Mike, who have managed to hide it for so long by the public pretence of mutual antagonism and loathing.  In fact the whole scheme had been concocted with Rickie in mind as a convenient fall guy, there to take the rap if suspicions were aroused about Paul's death.  Paul and Rickie then set about meting out appropriate justice on the perfidious pair.

Cast
 William Sylvester as Paul Gregory
 Barbara Shelley as Anne Gregory
 Alexander Davion as Rickie Seldon
 Elizabeth Shepherd as Joan Marshall
 Mark Eden as Mike Williams
 Ronnie Carroll as Ronnie
 Barry Alldis as Compere
 Edward Evans as Chauffeur
 Frank Forsyth as Policeman

References

External links 
 
 Blind Corner at BFI Film & TV Database

1963 films
1960s thriller films
British thriller films
British black-and-white films
Films directed by Lance Comfort
Films about blind people
Films shot at Pinewood Studios
1960s English-language films
1960s British films